The 2012 Dudley Metropolitan Borough Council election was held on 3 May 2012 to elect members of Dudley Metropolitan Borough Council in the West Midlands, England, as part of the 2012 United Kingdom local elections. 26 seats were up for election, and the results saw the Conservatives losing to a majority of 11 seats to Labour.

Election Result

Ward Results

Amblecote

Belle Vale

Brierley Hill

Brockmore and Pensnett

Castle & Priory

Coseley East

Cradley & Wollescote

Gornal

Halesowen North

Halesowen South

Hayley Green & Cradley South

Kingswinford North & Wall Heath

Kingswinford South

Lye & Stourbridge North

Netherton, Woodside & St. Andrew's

Norton

Pedmore & Stourbridge East

Quarry Bank & Dudley Wood

Sedgley

St. James's

St. Thomas's

Upper Gornal & Woodsetton

Wollaston & Stourbridge Town

Wordsley

References

2012 Dudley Metropolitan Borough Council election (BBC)

2012 English local elections
2012
2010s in the West Midlands (county)